Henry Cieman (1905 – 12 January 1995) was a Canadian racewalker. He competed in the men's 50 kilometres walk at the 1932 Summer Olympics. He was the world record holder at multiple distances, including the mile (1931, 6:22), 1,500 meters (1934, 6:07.3), and 3,000 meters (1931, 13:54.4).

References

1905 births
1995 deaths
Athletes (track and field) at the 1932 Summer Olympics
Canadian male racewalkers
Olympic track and field athletes of Canada
Athletes from Toronto
Athletes from London
English emigrants to Canada